The United California Bank burglary took place on 24 March 1972, when the safe deposit vault at United California Bank in Laguna Niguel, California, was broken into and $9 million ($ million today) in cash and valuables were looted by professional burglars led by Amil Dinsio.

Background and the robbery 
Dinsio's accomplices were his brother, James Dinsio, his nephews Harry and Ronald Barber, his brother-in-law Charles Mulligan, alarm expert Phil Christopher, and Charles Broeckel. The Dinsio crew was from Youngstown, Ohio and Christopher and Broeckel were from Cleveland. Amil Dinsio was the mastermind of the operation but he worked closely with his brother James, an explosives expert and designer/fabricator of burglary tools. His brother-in-law, Charles Mulligan, was the driver and look-out man. The inclusion of Phil Christopher and Charles Broeckel was forced upon Dinsio by the person who clued him in on the score. Dinsio reluctantly took Broeckel along as muscle only, which proved to be a critical mistake. He had no skills needed to assist in any other way with the robbery as he was nothing more than a petty thief. Broeckel helped inside the vault to bust open safe deposit boxes. Christopher played a key role in disarming the alarm. The total stolen was estimated at nearly $9 million.  The gang gained entry to the vault by using dynamite to blast a hole in its reinforced concrete roof.

Investigation and arrests 
While the burglary itself was executed perfectly, the thieves made the mistake of perpetrating a similar crime back in Ohio a few months later.  The FBI linked the two burglaries, and their investigation of transportation records revealed that five of the gang members had travelled to California on a single flight using their own names. A sixth man, James Dinsio, arrived on a separate flight the day before the crime. They also learned of the townhouse used as a HQ, which had been rented by the Barber brothers.  A search initially found nothing, until the dishwasher was checked.  The burglars had forgotten to run the dishwasher before returning to Ohio, and the recovered fingerprints permitted federal arrest warrants to be issued. This led to the arrest and conviction of all the burglars, along with recovering only some of the money.

Trial and witness tampering 
Earl Dawson, who assisted the police and testified against the gang, was offered money by his brother Harold Dawson to influence his testimony. Earl Dawson was placed in the witness protection program as was Charles Broeckel, who testified against his co-conspirators in exchange for immunity from prosecution.

In popular culture 
Accounts of the burglary and investigation have been shown on truTV and Investigation Discovery. Dinsio’s book, Inside The Vault, was self-published in 2014 with the assistance of his daughter.  The 2012 movie Superthief discussed Christopher's knowledge of alarm systems and his role in the planning and execution of the burglary.  The incident is used as the basis of the 2019 movie Finding Steve McQueen. ‘All the President’s Money,’ the 2021 premiere of NBC’s Super Heists, featured the United California burglary, with Dinsio recounting his story that the bank was targeted to recoup contributions from Jimmy Hoffa to the 1972 Nixon campaign by stealing a slush fund. Dinsio was portrayed by Bill Allen, and FBI agent Frank Calley was portrayed by Shawn Hatfield.

See also 

List of large value US robberies

References 

Porrello, Rick; Superthief: A Master Burglar, the Mafia, and the Biggest Bank Heist in U.S. History; 272 pp.; Next Hat Press (2005);

External links 
Official site of Amil Dinsio
Bang for the Bucks by Keith Sharon
Day 12: The largest bank heist in U.S. history targets Nixon’s millions
1972 United California Bank Robbery, Laguna Niguel
Masterminds: "The Laguna Niguel Heist" – on YouTube

1972 crimes in the United States
1972 in California
Bank burglaries
Crimes in California
March 1972 events in the United States
Laguna Niguel, California